Proscelotes aenea, also known as the montane skink, is a species of lizard. It is endemic to Mozambique. After not having been recorded for over 100 years, in 2021 it was reported to have been rediscovered from the coast near Lumbo, after scientists managed to determine the exact location of its broadly defined type locality.

References

Proscelotes
Lizards of Africa
Reptiles of Mozambique
Endemic fauna of Mozambique
Reptiles described in 1928
Taxa named by Thomas Barbour
Taxa named by Arthur Loveridge